Ghanim is a surname. Notable people with the surname include:
Antoine Ghanim, Lebanese politician and an MP in the Lebanese Parliament
Ghanim Abdulrahman al-Harbi, Saudi detainee at Guantanamo Bay
Ghanim Al-Jumaily (born 1950), the ambassador of Iraq to Saudi Arabia
Ghanim Bin Saad Al Saad (born 1964), Arab businessman
Ghanim Oraibi (born 1961), Iraqi football defender
Ibrahim Al-Ghanim (born 1983), Qatari footballer
Khalil Ghanim (born 1964), footballer from UAE
Marzouq Al-Ghanim, member and the current speaker of the Kuwaiti National Assembly
Mohammed Ghanim, former Qatari football player
Mohammed Rajab Sadiq Abu Ghanim, Yemeni detainee at Guantanamo Bay
Mubarak Ghanim, (born 1963), footballer from UAE
Nassir Al-Ghanim (born 1961), Kuwaiti football midfielder
Nasser Ghanim Al Khulaifi (born 1973), Qatari sports businessman, former professional tennis player
Shukri Ghanim (1942–2012), Libyan politician, General Secretary of the General People's Committee of Libya (2003–2006)
Wahib al-Ghanim (1919–2003), Syrian physician who confounded the Ba'ath Party

See also
Ghanim (crater), impact crater in the northern hemisphere of Saturn's moon Enceladus
Al Ghanim, settlement in Qatar, located in the municipality of Ad Dawhah
GSSG - Ghanim Bin Saad Al Saad & Sons Group (GSSG), the largest private sector company headquartered at Doha, Qatar
Ganim
Ghanima (disambiguation)